The Mr. America contest is a bodybuilding competition started by the Amateur Athletic Union (AAU).  It was first held on July 4, 1939, and the winner was named "America's Best Built Man".  In 1940 this was changed to what is now known as the Mr. America contest. In the mid-1940s, Joe and Ben Weider started the IFBB as an alternative to the AAU.  They held their opposing contest, the IFBB Mr. America, in 1949 and then from 1959 through 1977. Rights to the Mr. America name have been sold several times after AAU discontinued holding the contests in 1999.

History
The AAU voted to discontinue holding bodybuilding competitions in 1999.

In 2004, the World Bodybuilding & Fitness Association (WBFA) announced they had acquired the rights to the Mr. America name and would resume running contests under that banner.

In 2006 Bob Bonham acquired the rights and from 2011 through 2013 held the Mr America contest under the sanction of the INBF (International Natural Bodybuilding Federation), which is the amateur division of the WNBF (World Natural Bodybuilding Federation). The contests were drug tested under strict WADA (World Anti Doping Agency) guidelines using U.S. Olympic laboratory testing.

In 2015, rights to Mr. America were acquired by Bruce Ebel, and the contest's annual event cycle resumed via MRA Promotions.  Qualifying events in spring were sponsored by the National Gym Association (NGA), Nspire Sports League (NSL), and Ultimate Fitness Events (UFE). The Mr. America Expo and contest was to have been held in Baltimore in October 2017.

The contest resumed in 2020 (with no specific organization affiliation), promoted by Marc Tauriello of Mr America LLC. The Mr. America Sports Festival & Expo is held in October in Atlantic City, New Jersey, and broadcast on the CBS Sports Network.

Historic winners

Recent winners

See also 
List of professional bodybuilding competitions

References

Further reading 
 Fair, John D.  Mr. America: The Tragic History of a Bodybuilding Icon (2015)  Excerpt

External links 
 The Mr. America Contest: A Brief Background
 The History of the Mr./Ms. America Contest (archived)
 The Mr. America Contest: 1988 Competition
 Official Mr. America Page

1939 establishments in the United States
Mr. America
Bodybuilding competitions in the United States
Recurring sporting events established in 1939